The Secretary for Administration and Justice is the most senior cabinet role and key departments in the Government of Macau. When the Chief Executive is on leave, the Secretariat for Administration and Justice, according to Article 55 of the Basic Law, is of first priority to take up the responsibility of acting Chief Executive.

The department was the amalgamation of:
 Secretary for Justice
 Secretary for Public Administration, Education and Youth

List of responsibilities:
 Public Administration and Civil Service Bureau
 Legal Affairs Bureau
 Printing Bureau
 International Law Office
 Civic and Municipal Training Centre
 Judicial Reform Office (Gabinete para a Reforma Judica)

List of Secretariats

Former Officials
 Dr. Jorge Alberto Hagedorn Rangel - Secretary for Public Administration, Education and Youth
 Ho Ven On - Assistant Secretary

Procurator-General

The Procurator General is the actual highest law officer in Macau and not the Secretary for Administration and Justice. It replace the role of Attorney General of Macau in 1999.

See also
Other principal officials of Macau:
 Secretary for Economy and Finance
 Secretary for Security
 Secretary for Social Affairs and Culture
 Secretary for Transport and Public Works

References

External links
 Organization Chart of the MSAR

Government departments and agencies of Macau
Administration and Justice, Secretariat for
Macau
Positions of the Macau Government
1999 establishments in Macau